The Catholic University Cardinals men's basketball team represents The Catholic University of America in the National Collegiate Athletic Association (NCAA) Division III college basketball competition as a member of the Landmark Conference. They won the national championship in the 2000–2001 season, and are the only program in Division III to reach the Sweet Sixteen five consecutive seasons, from 1998–2002.

History
The team began as a club sport in the 1909–10 season, and gained varsity status the following year.  Although it did not have an official head coach, the roster listed Joseph Bollin as the team's "manager."  The first game during the club sport era was against Georgetown University, and the first official game was a 42–33 home victory over Gallaudet University on January 7, 1911.  They followed it with a 37–34 victory over St. John's College in Annapolis, but lost the remaining six games of the season to finish 2–6.

Fred Rice, a graduate student, joined the team in the 1911–12 season as a player coach.  Rice had previously played at Georgetown, where he earned a law degree.  The team improved to 10–7, and then 13–3 in 1912–13.

The December 1916 edition of The Catholic University of America Bulletin declared that, under Rice's leadership,

The Brookland Gymnasium, the first on-campus arena, opened in 1924.  The team won their first two games in it, and went 38–15 from 1925 to 28.

NCAA tournament results 
The 1943–44 men's basketball team won the Mason-Dixon Conference title and made the program's first trip to the NCAA Tournament. The team played in Madison Square Garden, losing to Dartmouth and Temple. 

The 1963–64 season, Catholic played the NCAA College Division (Division II) Tournament at Hofstra, losing to Hofstra and Philadelphia. 

The men's basketball team won the 2001 NCAA Division III National Championship and was the only program in Division III to reach the Sweet Sixteen five consecutive seasons, from 1998–2002. They also reached the postseason in 1993, 1996, 2003, 2004, 2006, 2007, 2013, 2015, and 2016.

Coaches

References

External links 
Official website